The Howard University sit-ins were a series of nonviolent protests at the Howard University in Washington, D.C. in 2018. The protests were called over students at the university accusing the university's administration for misusing funding. The protests began on March 30 and ended on April 6, 2018.

Reactions 
The Chronicle of Higher Education said that such a sit-in could lead to several other student sit-ins across the nation with students disgruntled at the university administration's handling of finances and social policy.

References

2018 in Washington, D.C.
Civil disobedience
Civil rights protests in the United States
History of African-American civil rights
Howard University
2018 protests